Nether Stowe School is an 11–18 mixed secondary school and sixth form with academy status in Lichfield, Staffordshire, England. It was established in 1964.

History 
Nether Stowe High School replaced Lichfield Central School in 1964, with the first 350 students being transferred upon its closure. It was substantially expanded in 1969.

Awards and achievements 
As of 2008, the school has achieved a Maths & Computing College status. The school also received an Artsmark reward; a school achievement award, and a Sportsmark award - all of which were awarded in 2001. In 2003, the school gained 'Investors In People' status and a 'School Extra' award.

The 2013 OFSTED report has shown that the school now places under the 'good' category, having moved up from 'satisfactory', with inspectors citing that the use of peer marking in lessons, carefully planned teaching and reading initiatives and good relationships between staff and pupils have increased attainment substantially. Students stated that they feel 'very safe' and the pupil premium that is being utilised has had a great benefit on those involved. Also noted was the fact that some lessons were 'outstanding' and that the school only has a few basic steps to take before becoming an outstanding school. The full report can be viewed on the school website at

Motto 
The current motto for the school is 'Aspire to Excellence'. Previously, it had been 'Altiora Peto', translated from Latin as 'Aim Higher'. The old motto is still visible on the school uniform.

Houses 
The school has various 'houses' in which competitions are played. This increases both competitiveness and extra education, as well as being a fun activity too. Usually, one is held in every term. The houses involved are Austen, Elgar, Francis and Turner, all of which are relative to key figures in society - Jane Austen, Edward Elgar, Clare Francis and J. M. W. Turner. Up until 2009, there was a fifth house - Brunel, representing Isambard Kingdom Brunel.

Early "House" names were also after famous names, Sir Humphrey Gilbert, Sir Francis Drake, Sir Philip Sydney and Sir Richard Grenville and their colours were blue, red, green and yellow respectively. There were 6 houses initially along with those four and they were Raleigh - Purple and Frobisher - White. At the end of the 1980s there were two registration form classes per year belonging to each house.  Form class designations were year/house/number. 5G2 would designate 5th year, Gilbert house, 2nd form room.  3Gr1, 3rd year, Grenville house, 1st form room.

The school abolished the form of 'house points' in 2010, in favour of a 'Credits & Debits' system, whereby credits are awarded for good behaviour and achievement, and debits are incurred for bad behaviour.

Improvements 
From 2019, the school has undertaken extensive refurbishment and development. This resulted in the creation of an extension to the front of school, housing the main reception as well as two classrooms and a brand new science laboratory. The work also entailed the refurbishment of existing classrooms, resulting in five new classrooms.

The new Nether Stowe Sports full-sized Hall was completed in 2020 to complement the existing inside space and swimming pool.

Further development work is scheduled for 2022 and 2023

Facilities 
In addition, the school leases its facilities to the community. A brand new and extensive Sports Hall was completed in 2020 for school and community use. Many clubs and organisations use the school facilities in the evening and at weekends.

Controversy 
According to an OFSTED inspection from 2004, the school, at the time, was notable for its failure to recruit suitable experienced staff members for long periods of time. In the same report, it was noted that the students of the time had a bad attitude to learning, and that teaching staff failed to control classes - thus, results were being affected badly. As a consequence, the school was put under special measures. This measure was lifted towards the end of 2005.

In 2007, the school came under scrutiny when incumbent headteacher Barrie Cooper announced to install CCTV cameras in the main toilets to quell the effects of problematic pupils - at the time, poor behaviour was rife. Although some students cited this as a good idea to cut down on violent incidents and gang gatherings, many felt that it was an invasion of privacy and that impressionable children may think that it is acceptable. The operational status of the cameras today is unknown, although they are still present.

List Of Headteachers 
 1966 to 1970 - Mr. C. L. Bower
 1970 to 1975 - Mr. H. winkler
 1975 to 1976 - Mr. A. K. Chatwood
 1976 to 1980 - Mr  Peter Davies
 1980 to 1991 - Mrs  Gina Butler
 1991 to 1999 - Mr. D. L. Binnie
 1999 to 2004 - Ms. J Ward
 2004 to 2008 - Mr. B Cooper
 2008 to 2009 - Mr. J McElroy (Acting Headteacher)
 2009 to 2018 - Ms. R Poppleton
 2018 to present - Mr. G Langston-Jones

References

External links 
 

Schools in Lichfield
Secondary schools in Staffordshire
Academies in Staffordshire